is a Japanese writer from Osaka. She has won the Noma Literary New Face Prize and the Akutagawa Prize, and two of her works have been adapted for film.

Career
Shibasaki was born in Osaka. She graduated from Osaka Prefecture University and held an office job for four years while writing fiction. In 1999 she published her first short story, "Reddo, ierō, orenji, burū" ("Red, Yellow, Orange, Blue"). Her first novel, Kyō no dekigoto (A Day on the Planet), was published the next year. In 2003 Kyō no dekigoto was adapted by Isao Yukisada into a film of the same name.

In 2006 Shibasaki won a MEXT Award for New Artists for Sono machi no ima wa (Today, in that City), which was then nominated in 2007 for the Akutagawa Prize, but did not win. In 2010 she won the Noma Literary New Face Prize for Nete mo samete mo, a first-person story about a woman who falls in love, loses her boyfriend, then meets a man who looks identical to her disappeared boyfriend but acts completely differently. In 2014, after having her work nominated three more times for the Akutagawa Prize, Shibasaki finally won the 151st Akutagawa Prize for her novel Haru no niwa (Spring Garden).

In 2016 the Japan Foundation sponsored her residency in the International Writing Program at the University of Iowa. The following year, an English translation of her Akutagawa Prize-winning novel Haru no niwa was published by Pushkin Press under the title Spring Garden. In 2018 Ryūsuke Hamaguchi's film adaptation of Nete mo samete mo, titled Asako I & II, entered the competition at the Cannes Film Festival.

Recognition
 2006 MEXT Award for New Artists for Sono machi no ima wa (Today, in that City)
 2010 Noma Literary New Face Prize for Nete mo samete mo
 2014 151st Akutagawa Prize (2014上) for Haru No Niwa (Spring Garden)

Film adaptations
 , 2003
 Asako I & II, 2018

Bibliography

Books in Japanese
 Nijiiro to kun, Chikuma Shobo, 2015, 
 Haru no niwa (Spring Garden), Bungei Shunju, 2014, 
 Watashi ga inakatta machi de (In Cities Before My Time), Shinchosha, 2012, 
 Shudaika, Kodansha, 2011, 
 Birijian (Viridian), Mainichi Shinbun, 2011, 
 Nete mo samete mo, Kawade Shobo, 2010, 
 Dorīmāzu (Dreamers), 2009, 
 Hoshi no shirushi, Bungei Shojo, 2008, 
 Furutaimu raifu (Full-time Life), Kawade Shobo, 2008, 
 Shotokatto (Shortcut), Kawade Shobo, 2007, 
 Sono machi no ima wa (Today, in that City), Shinchosha, 2006, 
 Kyō no dekigoto (A Day on the Planet), Kawade Shobo, 2000,

Selected work translated in English
 Spring Garden, trans. Polly Barton. Pushkin Press, 2017,

References

External links
 J'Lit | Authors : Tomoka Shibasaki | Books from Japan 
 Japanese Literature Publishing Project

1973 births
Living people
Japanese writers
Akutagawa Prize winners
People from Osaka
International Writing Program alumni